Together with Cliff Richard is a Christmas album by Cliff Richard, released in November 1991. The album features Richard singing popular traditional Christmas songs, his Christmas hits from recent years and two original songs.

The album reached number 10 in the UK Albums Chart and number two in New Zealand. The singles differed between regions. In the UK, "We Should Be Together" reached  number 10 in the UK Singles Chart in the week of Christmas. It was followed by "This New Year", released just in time for the new year and made number 30. In Europe and New Zealand, Richard's cover of the 1950s standard "Scarlet Ribbons" was released as a single, reaching number 51 in Germany and  number 19 in New Zealand.

A companion video of the album with the same title was also released at the same time, featuring all 12 tracks from the album plus Richard's 1960 Christmas hit "I Love You". Each song was filmed on a different set in front of an audience.

Track listing
"Have Yourself a Merry Little Christmas" (Ralph Blane, Hugh Martin)
"Venite (O Come All Ye Faithful)" (John Francis Wade)
"We Should Be Together" (Bruce Roberts)
"Mistletoe and Wine" (Jeremy Paul, Leslie Stewart, Keith Strachan)
"Christmas Never Comes" (Paul Field)
"Christmas Alphabet" (Buddy Kaye, Jules Loman)
"Saviour's Day" (Chris Eaton)
"The Christmas Song (Merry Christmas to You)" (Mel Tormé, Robert Wells)
"Little Town" (Chris Eaton, traditional)
"Scarlet Ribbons" (Evelyn Danzig, Jack Segal)
"Silent Night" (Franz Grüber, Joseph Mohr, traditional)
"White Christmas" (Irving Berlin)
"This New Year" (Chris Eaton)

Personnel
Adapted from AllMusic.

Keith Bessey – engineer
Dave Bishop – brass, alto sax, soprano sax, tenor sax
John Clark – guitar
Mickey Clark – background vocals
Paul Dunne – guitar
Andrew Greasly	– assistant, strings, violin
Mark Griffiths – bass
Graham Jarvis – drums, percussion
Gerry Kitchingham – engineer, remixing
Peter May – drums, percussion
Mae McKenna – vocals
Paul Moessl – arranger, conductor, drum programming, keyboards, producer
Sonia Jones Morgan – vocals
Mick Mullins – vocals
Keith Murrell – vocals
Tessa Niles – vocals, background vocals
Nigel Perrin – vocals, voices
Craig Pruess – arranger, keyboards, producer, programming
James Rainbird	– choir/chorus
Cliff Richard – primary artist, producer, vocal arrangement, vocals, background vocals
Frank Ricotti – drums, percussion
Tony Rivers & The Castaways – arranger, vocal arrangement, vocals, background vocals
Ben Robbins – engineer, remixing
Miriam Stockley – vocals
Steve Stroud – bass
Anthony "Packrat" Thompson – vocals, background vocals
Derek Watkins – brass, cornet

Charts and certifications

Weekly charts

Year-end charts

Certifications

Notes:
 The above New Zealand reference indicates platinum certification, however it was later certified double-platinum.

Australian release postponed
Curiously, the album's release in Australia was postponed until the 1992 Christmas season, despite Richard touring Australia late in 1991 (with his From a Distance tour) and including numerous songs from the Christmas album in the repertoire. EMI Australia instead allowed the previous year's From a Distance: The Event album to receive attention (as it had not yet charted) and released a new five-CD box set, The Cliff Richard Collection, made up of previously released material. Both sets did finally chart briefly at the end of the tour, reaching #21 and #25 respectively. When the Christmas album was eventually released in late 1992, momentum from the tour had since passed and the album did not chart.

References

External links
Together with Cliff Richard at Discogs

Cliff Richard albums
1991 Christmas albums
EMI Records albums
Christmas albums by English artists